The Type 41  naval gun otherwise known as the 8 cm/40 3rd Year Type naval gun was a Japanese dual-purpose gun introduced before World War I. Although designated as , its shells were  in diameter.

Design
The Japanese Type 41  naval gun otherwise known as the 8 cm/40 3rd Year Type naval gun was a direct copy of the English QF 12-pounder 12 cwt naval gun.  The original 12-pounders were built-up guns with a single-motion interrupted screw breech that fired Fixed Quick Fire ammunition and had bottom mounted hydro-pneumatic recoil systems. 

Many were mounted on low-angle pedestal mounts in casemates as the standard anti-torpedo boat gun on Japanese warships built between 1890 and 1920. Later guns changed to an autofretted monoblock barrel, taller pedestal mount for increased angles of elevation -5° to +75°, top mounted recoil system, and 45° sliding block breech.

After 1915 the guns were mounted on high/low angle mounts to serve as dual-purpose guns on most ships of the Imperial Japanese Navy and was still in service as late as the Pacific War as an anti-aircraft, coastal defense, and submarine deck gun.

Variants
 8 cm/40 (3") 11th Year Type (Model 1922) - Anti-aircraft gun.
 8 cm/40 (3") Type 88 (Model 1928) - Submarine deck gun.
 8 cm/25 (3") Type 41 - This was a related gun with a shorter barrel.  There were three sub-variants each with slightly different barrel lengths.  Length varied from 23 to 25 calibers depending on whether the length was measured from breech to muzzle or just the rifling was measured. This short gun was often used on smaller auxiliaries and submarines as a dual-purpose gun.

History
The first guns were bought from the English firms as "Elswick Pattern N" and "Vickers Mark Z" guns.  The gun was officially designated as the Type 41  naval gun from the 41st year of the reign of Emperor Meiji on 25 December 1908.  Thereafter production was in Japan under license.  On 5 October 1917 during the third year of the Taishō period, the gun was redesignated as the 8 cm/40 3rd Year Type naval gun as part of the Imperial Japanese Navy's conversion to the metric system.  Although classified as an 8 cm gun the bore was unchanged.  

The 8 cm/40 3rd Year Type was also widely used as a coastal defense gun and anti-aircraft gun to defend Japanese island bases during World War II. Guns with both English and Japanese markings were found on Kiska, Kolombangara, Saipan, Tarawa, and Tinian.  Japanese Artillery Weapons CINPAC-CINPOA Bulletin 152-45 calls the guns "8 cm Coast Defense Gun 13th Year Type (1924)" but it isn't clear how they came up with that designation.

Imperial Japanese Navy
The 8 cm/40 3rd Year Type was deployed aboard armed merchantmen, battleships, cruisers, gunboats, minelayers, minesweepers, and submarines of the Imperial Japanese Navy.

Ship classes:

Foreign Users
 - Ning Hai-class cruisers
 - Thonburi-class coastal defence ships
 - Two guns were acquired by Romania at some point before the start of World War II. They formed a section of coastal anti-aircraft artillery at the mouth of the Sfântu Gheorghe branch of the Danube Delta. The section was named Lăstunul.

Gallery

References

Bibliography
 
 
 This page incorporates material from Japanese Wikipedia page :ja:四十口径三年式八糎高角砲, accessed 22 January 2016

External links

 8 cm/40 3rd Year Type on navweaps.com
 8 cm/25 Short Guns on navweaps.com

World War II naval weapons
World War II anti-aircraft guns
Naval guns of Japan
Naval anti-aircraft guns